Noel Kinsey (24 December 1925 – 20 May 2017) was a  Welsh international footballer who played as an inside right. He won seven international caps and scored 111 goals in 444 league games in a 14-year career in the Football League.

He began his career with Norwich City in 1947, helping the "Canaries" to second place in the Third Division South in 1950–51. He transferred to Birmingham City in 1953, helping the club to the Second Division title in 1954–55. He scored in the 1956 FA Cup Final, which ended in a 3–1 defeat to Manchester City. In February 1958 he was signed to Port Vale for a £5,000 fee, and helped the "Valiants" to the Fourth Division title in 1958–59. He became a player-coach at Vale Park in May 1960, before departing in April 1962. He later played for non-league sides King's Lynn and Lowestoft Town, and worked at Norwich Union Insurance. He entered the Norwich City F.C. Hall of Fame in 2003.

Club career

Norwich City
Kinsey started his career with Treorchy Amateurs and Cardiff City, before joining Norwich City in 1947. Duggie Lochhead's "Canaries" had to apply for re-election in 1947–48, after finishing second-from-bottom of the Third Division South. They rose to tenth in 1948–49, and then he finished as the club's top scorer in 1949–50 with 17 goals, as the club posted an eleventh-place finish. They reached second place in 1950–51 under new manager Norman Low, but only champions Nottingham Forest were promoted, who finished six points ahead of Norwich. They dropped to third in 1951–52, five points behind champions Plymouth Argyle. They then finished fourth in 1952–53, four points behind champions Bristol Rovers. In total he scored 57 goals in 223 league appearances at Carrow Road.

Birmingham City
In 1953, the Welsh international signed with Bob Brocklebank's Birmingham City. The "Blues" finished seventh in the Second Division in 1953–54, before winning the Second Division title in an extremely tight 1954–55 campaign under Arthur Turner's stewardship, finishing above third place Rotherham United on goal average. Kinsey scored 17 goals in 40 games of the club's historic 1955–56 campaign, including a hat-trick against Everton on Boxing Day at St Andrew's. They went on to finish sixth in the First Division, the best finish in the club's history, and also reached the 1956 FA Cup Final at Wembley. He scored a 15th-minute equaliser but Manchester City went on to win 3–1 despite goalkeeper Bert Trautmann suffering a serious neck injury, leaving Kinsey with a runners-up medal. Birmingham finished 12th in 1956–57 and 13th in 1957–58. Kinsey scored a total of 55 goals in 173 league and cup competitions for Birmingham City.

Port Vale
In February 1958 he was signed to Port Vale for a £5,000 fee, in a move that reunited him with former manager Norman Low. He scored twice past Watford in a 5–0 win at Vale Park on 8 March, to finish 1957–58 with two goals in 14 appearances in the last ever season of Third Division South football. He scored three goals in 37 games in 1958–59, as the "Valiants" won the inaugural Fourth Division championship. However, he lost his place in September 1959, and scored once in 19 Third Division games in 1959–60. In May 1960 he signed a player-coach contract, and played just six games in 1960–61. His contract was cancelled by mutual agreement in April 1962, at which point he moved on to King's Lynn of the Southern Football League. He later became the player-coach to Lowestoft Town in the Eastern Counties League.

International career
Kinsey won seven caps for Wales between 1951 and 1955. He featured in qualifying for the 1954 FIFA World Cup, playing in the 2–1 defeat to Northern Ireland at the Racecourse Ground on 31 March 1954.

Post-retirement and legacy
Kinsey ran a pub, before working at Norwich Union Insurance.

He was inducted into the 2003 inaugural Norwich City F.C. Hall of Fame.

Kinsey died at the age of 91 in May 2017.

Career statistics

Club statistics
Source:

International statistics

Honours
Individual
Norwich City F.C. Hall of Fame: 2003 inductee

Birmingham City
Football League Second Division: 1954–55
FA Cup runner-up: 1956

Port Vale
Football League Fourth Division: 1958–59

References

1925 births
2017 deaths
People from Treorchy
Sportspeople from Rhondda Cynon Taf
Welsh footballers
Wales international footballers
Association football forwards
Cardiff City F.C. players
Norwich City F.C. players
Birmingham City F.C. players
Port Vale F.C. players
Lowestoft Town F.C. players
English Football League players
Southern Football League players
Association football coaches
Port Vale F.C. non-playing staff
FA Cup Final players